Calhoun County School District is a school district headquartered in Anniston, Alabama.

It serves most areas in Calhoun County, although the cities of Anniston, Jacksonville, Oxford, and Piedmont are served by separate school districts.

Schools
Secondary Middle-high:
 Ohatchee High School
 Pleasant Valley High School
 Walter Wellborn High School
 Weaver High School

High:
 Alexandria High School
 Saks High School
 White Plains High School

Middle:
 Alexandria Middle School
 Saks Middle School
 Its attendance area, between Anniston and Jacksonville, consists of suburban areas.
 White Plains Middle School

Elementary:
 Alexandria Elementary School
 Ohatchee Elementary School
 Its attendance area is in a rural area.
 Pleasant Valley Elementary School
 Saks Elementary School
 Its attendance area, between Anniston and Jacksonville, consists of suburban areas.
 Walter Wellborn Elementary School
 Weaver Elementary School
 White Plains Elementary School

Other:
 Career Academy

References

External links
 Calhoun County Schools at Schoolwires
 
Education in Calhoun County, Alabama
School districts in Alabama